The Vermont Statutes Annotated is the official codification of the laws enacted by the General Assembly of the U.S. state of Vermont.

Vermont Statutes
Title 1: General Provisions
Title 2: Legislature
Title 3: Executive
Title 3 Appendix: Executive Orders
Title 4: Judiciary
Title 5: Aeronautics and Surface Transportation
Title 6: Agriculture
Title 7: Alcoholic Beverages
Title 8: Banking and Insurance
Title 9: Commerce and Trade
Title 9A: Uniform Commercial Code
Title 10: Conservation and Development
Title 10 Appendix: Conservation and Development
Title 11: Corporations, Partnerships and Associations
Title 11A: Vermont Business Corporations
Title 11B: Nonprofit Corporations
Title 12: Court Procedure
Title 13: Crimes and Criminal Procedure
Title 14: Decedents' Estates and Fiduciary Relations
Title 15: Domestic Relations
Title 15A: Adoption Act
Title 15B: Uniform Interstate Family Support Act (1996)
Title 16: Education
Title 16 Appendix: Education Charters and Agreements
Title 17: Elections
Title 18: Health
Title 19: Highways
Title 20: Internal Security and Public Safety
Title 21: Labor
Title 22: Libraries, History, and Information Technology
Title 23: Motor Vehicles
Title 24: Municipal and County Government
Title 24 Appendix: Municipal Charters
Title 25: Navigation and Waters
Title 26: Professions and Occupations
Title 27: Property
Title 27A: Uniform Common Interest Ownership Act (1994)
Title 28: Public Institutions and Corrections
Title 29: Public Property and Supplies
Title 30: Public Service
Title 31: Recreation and Sports
Title 32: Taxation and Finance
Title 33: Human Services

See also
Government of Vermont
Vermont Law School, the only law school in Vermont
Vermont court system
Vermont Supreme Court

References

External links
Vermont Statutes Annotated at LexisNexis (official publisher)
Vermont Online Law Reference

United States state legal codes
Vermont law